The Glass House is a heritage-listed domestic dwelling at 80 The Bulwark, Castlecrag, City of Willoughby, Sydney, New South Wales, Australia. It was designed by Bill Lucas. It is also known as Glasshouse; Bill Lucas House. It was added to the New South Wales State Heritage Register on 21 October 2016.

History 
The Glass House was designed by Sydney architect Bill Lucas as a home for him to share with his wife, fellow architect Ruth Lucas, and their children, and was also to be used as a studio for their architectural practice and completed in 1957.

Lucas was born in Sydney in 1924. He trained as a Manual Arts Teacher before the war, reflecting his love and great skill in carpentry. After three years of military service from 1943 through 1946, he trained at the School of Architecture, University of Sydney, and studied visual art at East Sydney Technical School. He worked with the New Zealand firm Hugh Grierson Architects after graduating. By the mid-1950s, he had completed several domestic and community design projects, chiefly in southern Sydney's bush suburbs. He then joined a Design Group with Tony Moore, Neville Gruzman and Ruth Harvey (his future wife). Lucas helped to establish the school of architecture at the University of New South Wales and did part-time tutoring there for many years. For the last 22 years of his career, he maintained himself on a small war pension and offered his architectural and technical services honorarily only.[1]

Bill and Ruth Lucas were passionate about the relationship between good design, heritage conservation, public education and thriving, fair communities. Lucas' design projects included educational centres, an Aboriginal women's refuge, and furniture and theatre sets. The family moved to Paddington in the early 1960s and joined the campaign to help save the area from slum clearance. Lucas dedicated many years of his life to litigation and lobbying for this cause and contributed to the preservation of Paddington as an area of historic and architectural importance.[1]

Lucas worked to develop architectural processes and prototypes, not merely unique designs. He did this to aid a vision of ecologically sustainable housing, communities and cities. He was a significant proponent of architectural innovation in NSW and a highly esteemed member of the loose association of architects that is now known as the Sydney School. The architectural approaches and construction systems he developed contributed to the transformation of domestic architecture, in particular during the post-war decades, and they continue to inspire architects in the new century.[1]

Lucas' Glass House at Castlecrag is esteemed by architects as a seminal example of "shelter-in-nature" design, a design philosophy developed by members of the Sydney School. These Sydney architects drew on aspects of the modern movement that had grown up in London, New York and parts of the Soviet Union in the first decades of the twentieth century. The movement became influential in Brazil, South Africa, Mexico, Japan, and to some extent Australia during the 1920s and 1930s. The influence of the movement in Australia was partly through Walter Burley Griffin's designs, which referenced the architecture of Frank Lloyd Wright, a key proponent of the movement in America.[1]

After the war, the movement diversified. Architects in Australia and elsewhere placed a strong emphasis on responding to local natural and cultural environments, and this led to many schools of design with regionally distinctive characteristics. In Australia, the post-war years saw a renewed discussion about possibilities for a specifically Australian tradition and cultural identity. Modernism, seeming to be an international language, became an important part of this conversation. The Australian modern movement got underway in the late 1940s as Harry Seidler's uncompromising dwellings transplanted the International Style into the Sydney landscape.[1]

The Sydney School of the 1950s and 1960s strove to develop domestic architecture to suit this city, drawing on modernism and brutalism and the "International Style". Promulgating this philosophy, the Design Group, to which Lucas belonged, aimed to design "cutting edge buildings that were Australian, for Australians, using only Australian plant material in the gardens". These architects' quest was partly a response to the post-war boom in suburban development, spreading a landscape of rows of fibro and file boxes across the Cumberland Plain in a way that seemed to not concede to the Australian climate or the local landscape. The efforts of the Sydney School resulted in a smattering of houses, particularly in Sydney's leafy, rugged northern suburbs, but also groups of project homes like those built by Pettit and Sevitt in Carlingford and elsewhere. Jennifer Taylor in her retrospective on the Sydney School, first published in 1972, An Australian Identity: houses for Sydney 1953–63, felt that these homes achieved their aim, she wrote: 'The climate was respected, the potential of local materials recognized, and the inherent merit of indigenous flora and local topography exploited. The result has been an Australian house.'[1]

Comparisons can be made with several other residences designed by other architects associated with the adaption of modernist principles to domestic buildings in Sydney, including Jack House, Wahroonga, designed by Russell Jack (1957); Lyons house, Dolan's Bay, designed by Robin Boyd (1966); The Audette House, Castlecrag, designed by Peter Muller in 1953; and Simpson-Lee House, Wahroonga designed by Arthur Baldwinson (1957). Like these other houses, the Glass House features a flowing open plan interior separated, if at all by lightweight partitions; an innovative construction method aimed at integrating the home with the natural vegetation, views, light and other aspects of the environment; and a minimalist aesthetic featuring glass and timber and emphasising the relationship of interior and exterior.[1]

Lucas selected a steep and rocky site and developed a construction system that could perch amongst the rocks and suspend the living spaces between the trees with only minimal disturbance - four slender steel columns extending up through the house, with the floors suspended from them. As a result, the four slender support columns and an entry ramp are the only points which touch the ground. Lucas felt that having chosen a site, people should adapt their living to it, rather than building homes to render it unrecognisable. The flora on the site has continued to grow, and trees now grow up through the central light well.[1]

Lucas observed that housing is often "defensive", aimed at protecting the inhabitants against other people and the environment. He found this a sign of the "basic insecurity" of Western life, and he took care to orientate the Glass House towards the outside and maintain openness towards the environment.

The Glass House was also designed with economy in mind, as a model for accessible housing, employing a modular design, and standard, but chemical free, low-cost off-the-shelf industrial products and second hand building materials. Like other residential buildings designed by architects of the "Sydney School", Lucas' Glass House makes use of natural, rough, self-finished materials. The house's surfaces are not painted or clad, and the structure of the building is readily discerned with the frame only minimally closed-in using glass on many of the surfaces. As Lucas noted in the introduction to "Architecture into Millennium III", he selected materials that can be utilized to satisfy needs with as little effort as possible, self-finished, maintenance free, that improve with wear, that merge with natural surroundings and that provide an appropriate background for living. I prefer the "construction" to provide the "finish". This framework represents a highly unusual way of building a house. Ties are used to create the tension necessary to suspend the building from its frame, like a light aircraft.

The Glass House, at 80 The Bulwark, Castlecrag is part of Walter Burley Griffin and Marion Mahony Griffin's 1920s subdivision. The couple had arrived in Australia in 1914, having won the competition for the design of the new national capital, Canberra. In 1920, Griffin formed the Greater Sydney Development Association Ltd to build residential estates on three picturesque headlands in Sydney's Middle Harbour. Castlecrag was the first of these estates, begun in 1921. Griffin intended the estate to keep and complement the character of the landscape, and to provide a model for a way of life that would harmonise with the natural environment. He set out a street pattern that followed the contours of the rugged headland, and interspersed public reserves and connecting pathways with the house lots, intending public and private to merge unbounded by property fences. Griffin designed and built several distinctive houses of rock and concrete to show the style of house that lot-purchasers would be required to build. He and Marion moved from Melbourne to Castlecrag in 1924 and Marion took the role of a community leader at Castlecrag, organizing a variety of cultural activities from ballet classes to classical drama, staged in a rock-gully adapted to serve as an amphitheatre. The Castlecrag Progress Association, the Castlecrag Conservation Society, the Castlecrag Playreading Group, the Haven Theatre Committee and the Walter Burley Griffin Society continue the community spirit started and inspired by the Griffins. While the estate nurtured a small community, it did not gain further momentum at this stage: by 1937, only nineteen houses, sixteen of them designed by Griffin, had been built on the 340 lots. The development of Castle Cove and Middle Cove, according to the Griffins' vision, was also prevented by financial constraints, and then deferred until the post-war years.

The Glass House was one of three adjoining houses designed by Lucas on The Bulwark. Lucas was an admirer of the Griffins' work and committed to their vision of Castlecrag. The house is a reinterpretation of the restrictive covenants imposed by the Griffins on these land parcels; the design of the house took a very different direction to Walter Burley Griffin's own designs, being light and open compared to Griffin's quite solid, monumental buildings. Castlecrag attracted several other architects post-war, experimenting with design philosophies similar to those developed by Lucas. They designed homes including Peter Muller's Audette House and the home of Hugh and Eva Buhrich on Edinburgh Road, and the house designed for photographer Max Dupain by Arthur Baldwinson on The Scarp. The Australian Institute of Architects and Local Government recognise several these properties for their heritage values.

For the architectural community, the Glass House remains a landmark building. Its extreme minimalism and its sensitive relationship to the bushland site continue to provide inspiration. Former partner Neville Gruzman sees it as one of Australia's most important houses. In his obituary for Lucas, Gruzman describes the Glass House as extraordinary deceptively simply: "if ever a house touched the ground lightly, it was this one this house threw aside every precept of house design and construction: it featured minimal cost, minimal structure, minimal energy use and was beautiful". Similarly, Peter Moffit, in his obituary for Lucas in the Sydney Morning Herald found the house striking in its simplicity and for its lightness on the steeply sloping bush site, "audaciously simple in its concept, it stands on tiptoes amongst the boulders and the ferns on four slender steel posts - the house appears to barely touch the ground, suspended amongst the trees".

Docomomo International recognises the Glass House as a seminal example of the "shelter-in-nature" minimalist compositions constructed in northern Sydney post World War II and compares it with other exceptional modern movement buildings internationally, including Philippe Chareau's Maison de Verre in Paris (c. 1929), Mies Van de Rohe's Barcelona Pavilion (c. 1929), and Charles Eames 1949 house in Santa Monica. William J. R. Curtis, author of Modern Architecture since 1900, singles out the Glass House as a remarkable example of an Australian adaptation of modernist principles, being "so understated that it virtually disappeared into its wooded setting" and emphasising a casual lightness, simplicity and openness that articulated the Australian way of life as it was being understood.

Description 
 The Glass House is a single-storey residence built over a steeply sloping bush site. One corner of the house barely touches the natural sandstone outcrops. The rest of the building and the decks are suspended over natural vegetation and rock outcrops. A timber framework is braced with steel cross-bracing: four slender steel posts are the main structural elements, forming the corners of the internal court/lightwell. The steel structure extends to the roof level and the floors are hung by steel rods from the roof height. Entry is from a path beside the carport. There is no formal hall. Visitors enter straight into the first living room, which was used by Bill and Ruth Lucas for meetings with clients. A wall separates this area from the kitchen and a larger portion of the living/dining room.[1]

The living room and kitchen are predominantly glazed, opening onto the front deck and the internal deck and light well. A passage leads from the living room at the entrance, past the laundry/bathroom, to the series of bedrooms that run across the southern side of the building. A balcony runs the length of this elevation. Initially, the central room on this elevation, like the living/dining room on the northern elevation, was not partitioned. The salvaged septic tank that was tied to form a bath survives. The floor is tiled with a slate that has cracked because of the movement of the structure. The house used to move considerably in the wind before 2003 (up to 8cms of movement side to side) due to lose and missing cross-struts and beams that originally braced the house. Remedial work in 2003 replaced and repaired the cross-struts and beams, and installed new foundation fittings for the five small pillars that support the house on the rock foundations, replacing the previously rusted and weakened fittings. This eliminated most of the house movement in wind.[1]

The outdoor spaces of the house are emphasised. The central two squares are formed by a deck and open well to the sandstone rock below. When the house was completed, there were no trees in the light well, but now trees grow up through the centre of the house. The fourth cube along the front is a covered outdoor room separating the living area from the studio. The studio has a small deck cantilevered over the trees below. This deck was cut around a tree which subsequently died. A deck also runs across the front (north) and the rear (south) of the house.[1]

The original construction is described in an article in Architecture in Australia, October–December 1957. The house is suspended on four  square columns, which extend through to the roof. It is of composite construction with steel kept to the minimum for economic reasons being used for tension rods and spacing and joining members. All the timbers are rough-sawn creosoted hardwood inside and out. Wall timbers are restricted to mullions, and posts at  centres and the roof framing to purlins at  centres on beams at  centres.[1]

The floor comprises  Stramit panels, being masonite faced on hardwood joists at  centres. Stramit is also used for the internal walls. To obviate the difficulty of local requirements for masonry, all external walls are of glass sheeting. The internal walls are not structural and the arrangement of the bedrooms and living areas can be varied to suit changing family needs.[1]

The roofing was originally constructed with deep corrugated asbestos cement, having no roof battens. Safety mesh was stretched over the purlins and supported a 57-gram (2 oz) white fibre-glass blanket between clear Visqueen and double-sided sisalation. This provides high thermal insulation, sound absorption and light reflection qualities, and has a pleasant, quilted appearance.[1]

The roofing was replaced in the early 1990s by a subsequent owner of the house with a corrugated iron Colourbond roof in olive green over a thin layer of isolation (sparking) and a marine plyboard base, which serves as the ceiling. The newer combined flat roof/ceiling lacks the effective insulation of the original ceiling, and transmits significantly more noise when rain falls, but provides a flat "ceiling" painted white compared to the original bagged insulation over the weld-mesh look, and is nearly invisible from the street view of the house.

Condition 
By 2000, the house's condition was severely degraded because of weathering. Extensive rust caused at least partly by spray from the nearby waterfall had seriously weakened the base fitting, where the five support pillars for the house were fixed to the foundation rock. Many of the cross-struts and fittings were also rusted, loose or missing fixtures, and not providing support. An engineering review noted the house was in danger of collapse because of a loss of up to 90% of the tensile strength of the support beams and struts. In 2002–2003, a remedial works program replaced all the foundation fittings and re-braced the house to reduce movement and improve strength while carefully maintaining the place's original design and engineering ethos. Bracing was increased in some areas from 1/2" steel rods to 3/4" steel rods, which provided much greater tensile strength for the house. Internal bracing was repainted from the original primer-red to a neutral green to blend into the external environment visible through the glass walls.

As of 1 January 2019, the condition of the building was good.

Heritage listing 

As of 9 February 2016, The Glass House is of state significance as a rare example of domestic design by influential architect Bill Lucas, which keeps a very high level of integrity. It is historically important in demonstrating the quest by Australian architects of the 1950s and 1960s to design homes to suit a Sydney lifestyle, informal, open to the outdoors, and appreciative of the natural beauty of the rocky harbourside and riverside suburbs in particular. The house both furthers and re-interprets Walter Burley Griffin and Marion Mahoney Griffins' vision for the suburb of Castlecrag. The building is iconic in its stark simplicity. Employing a highly innovative engineering system, the house is light, and open and makes barely a mark on the steep, rocky bushland slope. The Glass House has a strong association with its designer Bill Lucas, and also with Ruth Lucas, whose home it was. The couple were important figures in the loose grouping of architects known as the "Sydney School", and also in the urban conservation movement, and the design and construction of the house embody many of their concerns as urban conservationists. The extreme minimalism of the house's design and its unique engineering solution are likely to continue to provide inspiration and design knowledge to architects and other designers.[1]

The Glass House was listed on the New South Wales State Heritage Register on 21 October 2016, having satisfied the following criteria.[1]

The place is important in demonstrating the course, or pattern, of cultural or natural history in New South Wales.

The Glass House is an important place in the cultural and architectural history of New South Wales. It embodies a quest by Australian architects of the 1950s and 1960s to design homes to suit a Sydney lifestyle, informal, open to the outdoors, and appreciative of the natural beauty of the rocky harbourside and riverside suburbs in particular. This quest was part of, and important in, a wider movement to articulate a distinctive Australian identity in a newly globalised, post-war world. The house has likely helped to shape Australian expectations of the amenity of suburban living, particularly in subdivisions carved out of the steep, bushland gullies of Sydney in the 1960s and 1970s.[1]

The place has a strong or special association with a person, or group of persons, of the importance of the cultural or natural history of New South Wales's history.

The Glass House has a strong association with its designer Bill Lucas, and also with Ruth Lucas, whose home it was. The couple were important figures in the loose grouping of architects known as the "Sydney School". Bill Lucas contributed significantly to the modern movement in NSW. His designs, in particular The Glass House, are highly esteemed by other architects and have influenced the direction of domestic design in NSW. Bill and Ruth Lucas both connected the values of modern architecture and thoughtful design with philosophies of the public good: public education, heritage conservation and the arts. The Glass House, in employing recycled and chemical-free materials, and treading lightly on the site, demonstrates many of their concerns as urban conservationists.[1]

The place is important in demonstrating aesthetic characteristics and/or a high degree of creative or technical achievement in New South Wales.

The Glass House has aesthetic and technical significance for NSW. The building is iconic in its stark simplicity; light, open and making barely a mark on the steep, rocky bushland slope. The extreme minimalism of the house's design, construction and visual impact has inspired many architects in the decades since its construction. The Glass House is of technical significance for its unique engineering solution, which enabled a minimal footprint and the retention of the sandstone outcrops, eucalypts and ferns below, and for the conscious use, by the Lucas of Australian-made building materials. The house enhances the local architectural landscape by re-interpreting Griffin's garden suburb concept for Castlecrag.[1]

The place has a strong or special association with a particular community or cultural group in New South Wales for social, cultural or spiritual reasons.

The Glass House is of state heritage significance for its importance to architects and the wider community who appreciate modern design and architecture. The house has been recognised by prominent professional architectural bodies (including DOCOMOMO Australia and the NSW Chapter of the Australian Institute of Architects) and continues to be visited and written about, and it continues to inspire innovative design amongst the architectural community of NSW.[1]

The place has the potential to yield information that will contribute to an understanding of the cultural or natural history of New South Wales.

The Glass House is of state heritage significance for its potential to yield information about Lucas' highly innovative construction systems and their durability. The system was a prototype and embodies knowledge which will continue to be of value to architects and engineers.[1]

The place possesses uncommon, rare or endangered aspects of the cultural or natural history of New South Wales.

The Glass House is one of the very few surviving domestic buildings designed by Bill Lucas. It has rarity value at a state level as a virtually unaltered modernist residence embodying the "shelter-in-nature" principles of this highly influential architect and employing a unique design and construction method.[1]

The place is important in demonstrating the principal characteristics of a class of cultural or natural places/environments in New South Wales.

The Glass House is a carefully handled example of modular design, using standard, but chemical-free, low-cost off-the-shelf industrial products and second-hand building materials. The building can show the local application of Modern Movement concerns with the connection between internal and external space, the use of flexible internal space, moveable partitions and outdoor living areas, and can represent the philosophies and physical characteristics of "Sydney School" residences in NSW.[1]

See also 

Australian residential architectural styles

References

Bibliography

Attribution 

New South Wales State Heritage Register
Castlecrag, New South Wales
Houses in Sydney
Articles incorporating text from the New South Wales State Heritage Register
Houses completed in 1957
1957 establishments in Australia